The 2013 Jacksonville Jaguars season was the franchise's 19th season in the National Football League, the first under general manager David Caldwell, and the first under head coach Gus Bradley. Although they missed the playoffs and started 0–8, the Jaguars improved upon their then-franchise-worst 2–14 record from 2012; but failed to improve their 1–7 home record from last year. Much like 2012, the root of their victories were intra-division. The Jaguars also gained a close non-divisional victory over the Browns to finish 4–12.

Roster changes

Notable transactions

Acquisitions 
 LB Geno Hayes, signed on March 13, 2013.
 DT Roy Miller, signed on March 15, 2013.
 RB Justin Forsett, signed on March 15, 2013.
 CB Alan Ball, signed on March 15, 2013.
 DT Sen'Derrick Marks, signed on April 2, 2013.
 DT Brandon Deaderick, claimed off waivers on May 14, 2013. 
 CB Will Blackmon, signed on August 28, 2013.
 WR Stephen Burton, claimed off waivers on September 1, 2013. 
 SS Winston Guy, claimed off waivers on September 1, 2013. 
 TE Clay Harbor, claimed off waivers on September 1, 2013.

Departures 
 OT Guy Whimper, released on February 27, 2013.
 S Dawan Landry, released on March 8, 2013. 
 CB Aaron Ross, released on March 8, 2013. 
 G Eben Britton, declared free agent on March 12, 2013. 
 CB Derek Cox, declared free agent on March 12, 2013.
 RB Rashad Jennings, declared free agent on March 12, 2013.
 FB Greg Jones, declared free agent on March 12, 2013.
 DT Terrance Knighton, declared free agent on March 12, 2013.
 CB Rashean Mathis, declared free agent on March 12, 2013.
 CB William Middleton, declared free agent on March 12, 2013.
 LB Daryl Smith, declared free agent on March 12, 2013.
 WR Laurent Robinson, released on March 13, 2013. 
 DT C. J. Mosley, released on April 1, 2013.
 RB/FB Montell Owens, released on May 16, 2013.
 DE Austen Lane, released on June 13, 2013.
 WR Jordan Shipley, released on September 1, 2013. 
 FS Dwight Lowery, released from injured reserve on November 4, 2013.
 DE Jeremy Mincey, released on December 13, 2013.
 C Brad Meester, retired after 14 seasons with the team.

Trades 
 Defensive tackle D'Anthony Smith was traded to the Seattle Seahawks for a conditional draft pick. Smith was released by the Seahawks on September 24, meaning the conditions of the trade were not fulfilled and the Jaguars did not receive the draft pick. 
 Left tackle Eugene Monroe was traded to the Baltimore Ravens for the Ravens' fourth and fifth-round draft picks in the 2014 NFL Draft.

Draft

NOTES:
The Jaguars traded their original fourth-round selection (No. 98 overall) selection to the Philadelphia Eagles in exchange for the Eagles' 2013 fourth- (No. 101 overall) and seventh- (No. 210 overall) round selections.

Undrafted rookie free agents
The following is a list of notable rookie free agents signed after the 2013 NFL Draft:

Staff

Final roster

Schedule

Preseason

Regular season

Note: Intra-division opponents are in bold text.
 #  Blue/Red indicates the International Series game in London.

Game summaries

Week 1: vs. Kansas City Chiefs

Week 2: at Oakland Raiders

Week 3: at Seattle Seahawks

Week 4: vs. Indianapolis Colts

Week 5: at St. Louis Rams

Week 6: at Denver Broncos

Week 7: vs. San Diego Chargers

Week 8: vs. San Francisco 49ers
NFL International Series

Week 10: at Tennessee Titans

Week 11: vs. Arizona Cardinals

Week 12: at Houston Texans

Week 13: at Cleveland Browns

Week 14: vs. Houston Texans

Week 15: vs. Buffalo Bills

Week 16: vs. Tennessee Titans

Week 17: at Indianapolis Colts

Standings

Division

Conference

References

External links
 

Jacksonville
Jacksonville Jaguars seasons
Jackson